Francesca Kate Fiorentini (born September 10, 1983) is an American journalist, political activist and comedian.

Early life and education 
Fiorentini is a second generation American and daughter of immigrants. Her mother is Chinese and her father is Italian. She grew up in Palo Alto, California and graduated from Menlo-Atherton High School in 2001.

From 2001 to 2005, Fiorentini studied Feminist Theory and Colonial Studies at New York University. Her BA thesis was entitled 'Ideas for Action: Postcolonial Feminism'.

Career 
Fiorentini began her journalistic work in 2004 with War Resisters League and Left Turn.

From 2013 to 2019, Fiorentini was the host and senior producer of AJ+, the digital media outlet of Al Jazeera. She was the host of AJ+ show Newsbroke. The channel focuses on comedic spins on current events, with a focus on outreach to younger audiences. The program covered issues both current events, as well as larger issues such as white fragility, labour unionism, toxic masculinity, George Soros, and gun control. Newsbroke was shortlisted for an Emmy nomination for Outstanding Short-Form Variety Series in 2018. The program was discontinued during June 2018.

Since 2016, Fiorentini has appeared on progressive network The Young Turks as a guest and contributor. She is one of the hosts of The Young Turks show The Damage Report hosted by John Iadarola.

In December 2019, Fiorentini hosted the special Red, White & Who on MSNBC discussing the state of healthcare in the United States and the importance of healthcare to American voters beyond the partisan divide. The program travelled to the states of New York, Texas and Utah to talk to voters and featured interviews with political figures such as Senator Bernie Sanders. Fiorentini concluded in the program that "healthcare in America is often overpriced and even dysfunctional, but it’s the lack of transparency that can be the most insidious".

References

Living people
American journalists
American people of Chinese descent
American journalists of Chinese descent
American people of Italian descent
New York University alumni
The Young Turks people
1983 births
People from Palo Alto, California